Maayyafushi as a place name may refer to:
 Maayyafushi (Alif Alif Atoll) (Republic of Maldives)
 Maayyafushi (Lhaviyani Atoll) (Republic of Maldives)